A travesty is an absurd or grotesque misrepresentation, a parody, or grossly inferior imitation. In literary or theatrical contexts it may refer to:
Burlesque, a literary, dramatic, or musical work intended to cause laughter by caricaturing the manner or spirit of serious works, or by ludicrous treatment of their subjects
Travesti (theatre) (also spelled travesty), the portrayal of a character in a play, opera, or ballet by a performer of the opposite sex
Victorian burlesque, a genre of theatrical entertainment popular in Victorian England and New York theatre in the mid-19th century
Travesty generator or parody generator, a computer program that generates nonsensical text (travesty), often based on statistics of an input text

See also
Travesti (gender identity), a term used in South American cultures for a person who was born male but has a feminine gender identity
Travesties, a comedy by Tom Stoppard (1974)
Texas Travesty, a humor magazine published by students at the University of Texas at Austin